The Edge Open Saint-Gaudens Occitanie is a tournament for professional female tennis players played on clay courts. The event is classified as a $60,000 ITF Women's Circuit tournament and has been held in Saint-Gaudens, France, since 1997.

Past finals

Singles

Doubles

External links 
 Official website 

Tennis tournaments in France
Clay court tennis tournaments
ITF Women's World Tennis Tour
Recurring sporting events established in 1997